Nauru has 8 constituencies, and each of them includes one or more districts. Ubenide sends 4 members to the Parliament of Nauru, Meneng 3 members, the others all send 2.

List

See also
 Districts of Nauru

References

External links

 
Subdivisions of Nauru
Nauru